The National Polytechnic University of Armenia is a technical university located in Yerevan, Armenia. Established as the Karl Marx Institute of Polytechnic in 1933, it provides educational and research programs in various fields of technology and science related to engineering. The university includes a central campus in Yerevan and branch campuses located in Gyumri, Vanadzor and Kapan. Currently there are more than 8,000 students and more than 750 faculty members.

History
The university was founded by the Soviet government in 1933 as the Karl Marx Institute of Polytechnic including 2 faculties with 107 students. With the development of the industrial sector in the Armenian SSR, the university gradually grew. By the 1980s, the university had around 25,000 students.

With the independence of Armenia in 1991, the university name was changed to the State Engineering University of Armenia. In November 2014, the university was renamed as the National Polytechnic University of Armenia by the decision of the government of Armenia.

Campuses
As of 2016, the university has campuses in 3 Armenian cities other than Yerevan: 
Gyumri
Vanadzor
Kapan

Faculties and Institutes

As of 2016, the university has the following faculties:
Yerevan:
Faculty of Chemical Technologies and Environmental Engineering
Faculty of Applied Mathematics and Physics
Faculty of Mining and Metallurgy
Institute of Energetics and Electrotechnic 
Institute of Mechanical Engineering and Transportation Systems Design
Institute of Information and Communication Technologies and Electronics

The university has a faculty that provides online studies as well.

Gyumri campus:
Faculty of Technologies and sectoral economics
Faculty of Natural sciences and communication systems

The Gyumri campus provides online studies as well.

Vanadzor campus named after Petros Melkonyan:
Faculty of Technologies and sectoral economics
Faculty of Natural sciences and communication systems

The Vanadzor campus provides online studies as well.

Kapan campus:
Faculty of Technologies and sectoral economics
Faculty of Natural sciences and communication systems

International relations
As of 2016, the National Polytechnic University of Armenia has international cooperation with the following universities and institutions:

 China 
Jilin University
Shanghai Institute of Electric Power
Huazhong University of Science and Technology
 Finland 
Central Ostrobothnia Polytechnic
 France
Ecole Supérieure d’Ingénieurs de Marseille (ESIM)
Paris 12 Val de Marne University
Aix-Marseille University
University of the Mediterranean
Université de Droit, d’Economie et des Sciences
Chamber of commerce (Marseille)
 Germany
Technische Universität Ilmenau
Institute of Optoelectronics (Wesling)
Technische Universität Darmstadt and Stuttgart
 Greece
Aristotle University of Thessaloniki
National Technical University of Athens
Technological Educational Institute of Piraeus
 Italy
Sapienza University of Rome
University of Rome Tor Vergata
 Portugal 
Technical University of Lisbon
 Russia 
Moscow Institute of Energetics
Bauman Moscow State Technical University
Moscow Technical University of Communication and Informatics
 Spain 
University of Granada
Autonomous University of Barcelona
University of Alicante
 Sweden
Royal Institute of Technology (Stockholm)
Lund University
 Syria 
Damascus University
 Ukraine
Igor Sikorsky Kyiv Polytechnic Institute
Ukrainian State Academy of Light Industry (Kiev)
 United Kingdom 
Brunel University London
Queen's University Belfast
University of Huddersfield
 United States
California State Polytechnic University, Pomona
New Jersey Institute of Technology
Indiana University – Purdue University Indianapolis
Southern University
Grambling State University and Southern University New Orleans (Louisiana)

Rectors
 Hovhannes Babajanyan, 1934–1936
 Hmayak Ghondakhchyan, 1936–1937
 Ashot Melikjanyan, 1937
 Misak Petrosyan, 1937–1946
 Petros Melkonyan, 1946–1965
 Ashot Aslanyan, 1965–1966
 Artsrun Gasparyan, 1966–1980
 Rafayel Movsisyan, 1980–1988
 Yuri Sargsyan, 1988–2006
 Vostanik Marukhyan, 2006–2011
 Ara Avetisyan, 2011–2014
 Hovhannes Tokmajyan, 2014–2015
 Vostanik Marukhyan, 2015–2020
 Gor Vardanyan, 2021–present

Notable alumni
 Siranush Atoyan (1904–1985), Soviet Armenian architect
 Karen Demirchyan (1932–1999), former speaker of the National Assembly of Armenia
 Gevorg Emin (1919–1998), Armenian poet and writer.
 Robert Kocharyan (born 1954), former president of Armenia.
 Andranik Margaryan (2000–2007), former prime minister of Armenia.
 Levon Mnatsakanyan, former defense minister of the Nagorno Karabakh Republic
 Vartan Oskanian, former Minister of Foreign Affairs of Armenia.
 Aram Sargsyan, 9th prime minister of Armenia
 Tigran Torosyan, former speaker of the National Assembly of Armenia.
 Edmund Tsaturyan, member of the National Assembly of Armenia
 Tamar Tumanyan (1907–1989) Soviet Armenian architect
 Hrant Vardanyan, Armenian businessman.

Milestones
1933 February 27 - According to the Resolution of the Government of Soviet Armenia, the two Yerevan Institutes of Civil Engineering and Chemical Technology were merged and 1933.
1933 March 1 - Yerevan Polytechnic Institute (YPI) was established with two faculties: Faculty of Civil Engineering and Faculty of Chemical Technology.
1933 March 14 - In commemoration of 50 years after Karl Marx's death, the institute was renamed to Yerevan Karl Marx Polytechnic Institute.
1939 - Industrial Correspondence Education Institute joined YPI, becoming its Department of Correspondence Education.
1942 September 1 - The faculty of Electrical Engineering was founded.
1944 September 1 - The faculty of Mechanical Engineering was founded.
1946 Autumn - The first Students’ Scientific Conference of the institute took place.
1947 - The Students' Scientific Association of YPI was established.
1953 - The Faculty of Mining was founded.
1956 - The library reading hall of YPI with 45 thousand books was opened.
1957 May 1 - The first issue of the newspaper §Polytechnic¦ was published.
1959 - Leninakan (Gyumri) and Kirovakan (Vanadzor) Branches of YPI were founded.
1961 - The Faculty of Automatics and Computing Technics was founded.
1964 - The chamber music band of YPI was created.
1966 - The Faculty of Automatics and Computing Technics was renamed into the Faculty of Technical Cybernetics.
1972 - The Faculty of Radioelectronics was separated from the Faculty of Technical Cybernetics.
1972 - The Faculty of Power Engineering was founded.
1972 - The Branch of the Faculty of Radio-electronics was founded in Dilijan.
1974 - The Faculty of Social Specialities was established.
1978 - The Faculty of Computing Technics was founded based on the faculties of Technical Cybernetics and Radio Engineering.
1978 - The Faculty of Radioelectronics was renamed into the Faculty of Radio Engineering.
1985 - The Faculty of Transportation was organized with the units separated from the faculties of Machine Building and Mechanical Engineering.
1991 - The Stepanakert Branch of YPI was founded in Artsakh. Later in 1993, on its base the Artsakh University was established.
1991 November 29 - By the Order No 4 of the RA President, YPI was reorganized into State Engineering University of Armenia (SEUA).
1991 December 9 - The Resolution No 670 of the RA Government on the establishment of SEUA was adopted, which approved the guidelines of reformations in accordance with the SEUA Master Plan.
1992 - The Department of Mathematics was founded by the merger of three Mathematics chairs.
1992 - The Department of Social and Political Disciplines was founded, reorganized in 1994 into the Department of Social-Political Disciplines and General Economics.
1994 - The Department of Mechanics and Machine Science was created.
1994 - The Alumni Association and the Student Council of SEUA were established.
1996 - SEUA became a member of the Association of European Universities (AEU).
2001 June - The SEUA Interdepartmental Chair of Microelectronic Circuits and Systems was established based on the Armenian Branch of Leda Systems Co.
2001 July - The Student Career Service Center was founded.
2003 October - The 70th anniversary of establishing YPI-SEUA was celebrated. The president and the prime minister of RA participated in the celebration ceremonies.
2004 September - The university's historical classroom No 1301 was overhauled and now it serves as an assembly hall for Academic Council sittings and other solemn events.
2005 September - By the resolution of RA Government the traditional name "Polytechnic" was returned to the university as an acronym.
2005 December - The first session of the SEUA new Council was convened, and president of NAS RA Fadey Sargsyan was elected as a chairman of the council.
2006 May - The SEUA Alumni Union reorganized into Alumni Association, and the prime minister of RA A.Margaryan was elected as a president of the association.

See also
American University of Armenia
Armenian State Institute of Physical Culture
Armenian State Pedagogical University
Eurasia International University
Russian-Armenian (Slavonic) University
Yerevan State University
Yerevan State Linguistic University
Yerevan State Medical University
Yerevan State Musical Conservatory

References

External links
National Polytechnic University of Armenia, official site
National Polytechnic University of Armenia, Gyumri campus
National Polytechnic University of Armenia, Vanadzor campus
National Polytechnic University of Armenia, Kapan campus

Educational institutions established in 1933
Universities and institutes established in the Soviet Union
1933 establishments in the Soviet Union
National Polytechnic University of Armenia
Education in Yerevan